Magusa is a genus of moths of the family Noctuidae first described by Francis Walker in 1857.

Description
Similar to Euplexa, differs in third joint of palpi reaching above vertex of head. Dorsal tufts of abdomen are slight. Forewings very long and narrow. Apex rounded with oblique outer margin.

Species
Magusa barbara (Berio, 1940) Eritrea
Magusa divaricata (Grote, 1874)
Magusa erema Hayes, 1975 Galápagos Islands
Magusa orbifera (Walker, 1857) southern Canada - US - Argentina
Magusa versicolora (Saalmüller, 1891) Ghana, Nigeria, Cameroon, Central African Republic, Zaire, Malawi, Arabia, Ethiopia, Kenya, Tanzania, Zimbabwe, South Africa, Madagascar, Comoros, Reunion
Magusa viettei (Berio, 1955) Yemen, Kenya, Tanzania, South Africa, Madagascar

References

Hadeninae